Nayandahalli railway station (station code: NYH) is an Indian Railways Train station located in Nayandahalli, Bangalore in the Indian state of Karnataka and is located about 10 km away from the Bangalore City railway station. This station serves the Rajarajeshwari Nagar, Baapuji Nagara, Deepanjalinagara, and Vijayanagara areas of Bangalore city. It is located on Mysore–Bangalore line

Structure and expansion
Nayandahalli railway station has two platforms each running 400m in length, shelters, lighting, benches and a booking office facility available.

Rails
The trains between Bangalore and Mysore, Channapattana  and Tumkur and local trains halt in this station. The surrounding area's commuters of Vijayanagara, Rajarajeshwari nagara, katriguppe use this station.

See also
Bengaluru Commuter Rail
 Mysore–Bangalore railway line
Krishnadevaraya halt railway station

References

Railway stations in Bangalore Urban district
Railway stations in Bangalore